Javonte Williams (born April 25, 2000) is an American football running back for the Denver Broncos of the National Football League (NFL). He played college football at North Carolina and was drafted by the Broncos in the second round of the 2021 NFL Draft.

Early years
Williams attended Wallace-Rose Hill High School in Teachey, North Carolina. As a senior, he rushed for 2,271 rushing yards and 27 touchdowns. He committed to the University of North Carolina at Chapel Hill, his only FBS offer. He graduated as his school’s valedictorian.

College career
As a true freshman at North Carolina in 2018, Williams played in 11 games, rushing 43 times for 224 yards and five touchdowns. As a sophomore in 2019, he played in all 13 games and shared carries with Michael Carter. He ran for 933 yards on 166 carries with five touchdowns. Williams returned to North Carolina in 2020 and again shared carries with Carter. Throughout the 2020 season, Williams was statistically one of the top running backs in the country. Williams' name was mentioned during the season as a "dark horse" candidate for the 2020 Heisman Trophy. Against Miami (FL), Williams and backfield counterpart Carter combined for an NCAA-record 544 rushing yards as a duo in the Tar Heels' 62–26 blowout victory. Williams and Carter were both named to the 2020 Pro Football Focus First-team All-America at the running back position. PFF also named him the 2020 ACC Football Player of the Year with a record-breaking 95.9 PFF rushing grade, the highest rushing grade in a single season since the site began covering college players.

Professional career

Williams was selected by the Denver Broncos in the second round, 35th overall, of the 2021 NFL Draft. Williams signed his four-year rookie contract with Denver on July 23, 2021.

2021 season: Rookie year

Heading into his first training camp, Williams competed with Royce Freeman and Mike Boone for the backup running back role.  After the Broncos released Freeman during final roster cuts, they officially named Williams the backup running back, behind veteran starter Melvin Gordon.

Williams made his NFL debut in the Broncos' Week 1 victory against the New York Giants, recording 14 carries for 45 yards. Williams scored his first professional rushing touchdown against the New York Jets in Week 3, as the Broncos won the game 26–0. In Week 9, against the Dallas Cowboys, he had his first game going over 100 rushing yards with 111 on 17 carries. Williams received his first career start in Week 12 against the Kansas City Chiefs, as he replaced an injured Melvin Gordon.  Williams finished the game with 23 carries for 102 yards, six receptions for 76 yards and a receiving touchdown, though the Broncos lost the game 22–9.

Overall, Williams finished his rookie season appearing in all 17 games (one start) and recorded 203 carries for 903 yards (4.4 YPC) and four rushing touchdowns plus 43 receptions for 319 yards and three receiving touchdowns.

2022
In Week 1, Williams had 108 scrimmage yards in the 17–16 loss to the Seattle Seahawks. In the loss, he had 11 receptions. During Week 4 against the Las Vegas Raiders, Williams went down with a knee injury and left the game. It was later revealed that he suffered tears to the ACL, LCL, and posterolateral corner. The injury prematurely ended his 2022 season.

NFL career statistics

References

External links
 
Denver Broncos bio
North Carolina Tar Heels bio

2000 births
Living people
People from Wallace, North Carolina
Players of American football from North Carolina
American football running backs
North Carolina Tar Heels football players
Denver Broncos players